Laurynas Grigelis and Rameez Junaid were the defending champions but Grigelis decided not to participate.
Junaid played alongside Dustin Brown, but lost in the semifinals to Jesse Huta Galung and Konstantin Kravchuk.
They lost in the final 3–6, 6–4, [7–10] to Tomasz Bednarek and Andreas Siljeström.

Seeds

Draw

Draw

References
 Main Draw

Open Harmonie mutuelle - Doubles
2013 Doubles